Saint-Basile may refer to the following places:

 Saint-Basile, Ardèche, a commune in the department of Ardèche, France
 Saint-Basile, Quebec, in Quebec, Canada
 Saint-Basile, New Brunswick, in New Brunswick, Canada
 Saint-Basile-le-Grand, Quebec, in Quebec, Canada

See also:
 Saint-Bazile, a commune in the department of Haute-Vienne, France